PL-6 is a discontinued system programming language based on PL/I.  PL-6 was developed by Honeywell, Inc. in the late 1970s as part of the project to develop the CP-6 operating system, a follow-on to Xerox CP-V to run on Honeywell Series 60 and DPS-8 systems.

Description

Data types

PL-6 has no provision for floating point data.

Aggregates
Arrays are one dimensional and zero-based, with the zero specified explicitly.  For example, DCL x (0:4) SBIN; declares an array of five signed 36-bit integers.  The elements are numbered x(0), x(1),...,x(4).

Structures are also supported.  For example:

 DCL 1 struct,
       2 a,
         3 b CHAR(3),
         3 * CHAR(1),
       2 c CHAR(4);

declares a structure named struct consisting to two elements: a minor structure a consisting of a three-character field b and an unnamed one-character element ("*" indicates the element is unnamed), and a four-character element c.

The top level of the structure must be 1, and the remaining levels 2–10, if used, have to be specified in order with no levels skipped.

References

External links
 

Systems programming languages
Procedural programming languages
Programming languages created in the 1970s
Honeywell mainframe computers